Mohammed Ali Al-Dibiski, commonly known as Ali Al-Biski (1941 – 24 April 2019), is a Libyan former footballer who played as a striker. Although he did not score in FIFA approved competitions due to Libya's lack of participation at the time, he is the Libya national team's all-time top scorer.

Al-Biski was the top scorer of the 1965 Pan Arab Games and the 1966 Arab Nations Cup, and praised for his teamwork, dribbling and positioning by the Egyptian media. Al-Biski was also twice the top scorer of the Libyan Premier League: in 1965 with Al-Madina SC and in 1968 with Al Ahli Tripoli.

Career statistics

International goals

Scores and results list Libya's goal tally first, score column indicates score after each Libya goal.

References

External links
 Arab Cup - rsssf.com
 4th Pan Arab Games, 1965 (Cairo, Egypt) - rsssf.com

1941 births
2019 deaths
Libyan footballers
Libya international footballers
Association football forwards
Al-Madina SC players
Al-Ahli SC (Tripoli) players
Al Tarsana SC players
Al-Ittihad Club (Tripoli) players
Libyan Premier League players